Joseph de Joannis (6 June 1864 La Meignanne, Maine-et-Loire, Pays de la Loire – 27 October 1932 Paris) was a French clergyman and lepidopterist. De Joannis was the president of the Société entomologique de France from 1908 to 1916. His father Léon-Daniel de Joannis (1803–1868) was an entomologist and an ichthyologist.

He was most notable for his discovery of the glyphodes mascarenalis and his two books on entomology: Descriptions de Lépidoptères nouveaux de l'ile Maurice in 1906 and Lépidoptères Hétérocères des Mascareigns et des Seychelles in 1915.

References

1864 births
1932 deaths
French entomologists
Presidents of the Société entomologique de France